Yasin Özcan (born 20 April 2006) is a Turkish footballer who plays as a centre-back or left-back for Kasımpaşa.

Professional career
Özcan is a youth product of İl Özel İdaresispor, and Karadolap Gençlikspor before finishing his development at Kasımpaşa. He signed his first professional contract with Kasımpaşa in the summer of 2022 until 2025 at the age of 16. He made his professional debut with Kasımpaşa as a substitute in a 4–0 Süper Lig loss to İstanbul Başakşehir on 8 August 2022. He scored his first senior goal in a 3–1 loss to İstanbul Başakşehir on 21 January 2023 at the age of 16 years and 276 days, becoming the youngest goalscorer in the league that season, and one of the youngest goalscorers in Europe.

International career
Özcan is a youth international for Turkey, having played up to the Turkey U17s.

References

External links
 
 

2006 births
Living people
Footballers from Istanbul
Turkish footballers
Turkey youth international footballers
Kasımpaşa S.K. footballers
Süper Lig players
Association football defenders
Association football fullbacks